Beckom is a village in the central part of the Riverina. It had a population of 170 people on the 2006 Census night. The town was established with the opening of the railway line in 1908. Passenger services ceased in 1983 and the station closed in 1985 however the line remains open for goods trains.

Beckom Post Office opened on 4 January 1909 and closed in 1993.

History
Beckom takes its name from a settler's wife P 342 Inform., from the Royal Australian Historical Society Journal Vol. 8 Supplement.

Gallery

Notes and references

External links

Beckom Railway Siding

Towns in the Riverina
Towns in New South Wales
Coolamon Shire